The Battle of Mersivan was fought between the European Crusaders and the Seljuk Turks led by Kilij Arslan I in Northern Anatolia during the Crusade of 1101. The Turks decisively defeated the Crusaders who lost an estimated four-fifths of their army near the mountains of Paphlagonia at Mersivan.

The Crusaders were organized into five divisions: the Burgundians, Raymond IV, Count of Toulouse and the Byzantines, the Germans, the French, and the Lombards. The land was well-suited to the Turks—dry and inhospitable for their enemy, it was open, with plenty of space for their cavalry units. The Turks had been troublesome to the Latins for some days, at last making certain that they went where Kilij Arslan I wanted them to be and making sure that they only found a small amount of supplies.

The battle took place over several days. On the first day, the Turks cut off the crusading armies’ advances and surrounded them. The next day, Conrad led his Germans in a raid that failed miserably. Not only did they fail to open the Turkish lines, they were unable to return to the main crusader army and had to take refuge in a nearby stronghold. This meant that they were cut off from supplies, aid, and communication for an attack that may have taken place had the Germans been able to provide their own military strength.

The third day was somewhat quiet, with little or no serious fighting taking place, but on the fourth day, the crusaders made an intensive effort to free themselves from the trap that they were in. The crusaders inflicted heavy losses on the Turks, but the attack was a failure by the end of the day. Kilij Arslan was joined by Ridwan of Aleppo and other powerful Danishmend princes.

The Lombards, in the vanguard, were defeated, the Pechenegs deserted, and the French and Germans were also forced to fall back. Raymond was trapped on a rock and was rescued by Stephen and Conrad, constable of Henry IV, Holy Roman Emperor. The battle continued into the next day, when the crusader camp was captured and the knights fled, leaving women, children, and priests behind to be killed or enslaved. Most of the Lombards, who had no horses, were soon found and killed or enslaved by the Turks. Raymond, Stephen, Count of Blois, and Stephen I, Count of Burgundy fled north to Sinope, and returned to Constantinople by ship.

References

Sources

Battles involving the Seljuk Empire
Battles involving the Byzantine Empire
Crusade of 1101
Conflicts in 1101
12th-century crusades